The following details are for the programmes that ITV Breakfast currently broadcasts.

ITV Breakfast is the breakfast television franchise for the UK's ITV network. It began broadcasting on 6 September 2010 as the replacement for GMTV Limited.

Good Morning Britain
Good Morning Britain is the weekday breakfast television programme on the British commercial ITV network that broadcasts on weekday mornings from 06:00 to 08:30 (2014 - 2020), 06:00 to 09:00 (2020 - ) and is presented by Susanna Reid, Ben Shephard and Kate Garraway. It features news and entertainment stories interspersed with celebrity interviews, competitions, consumer and health items and news reports from the regions. Piers Morgan was also a presenter until 2021.

Lorraine
Lorraine is the early weekday morning, lifestyle and entertainment show for the British ITV network, presented by Lorraine Kelly. ITV Breakfast produces Lorraine, which airs every weekday from 08:30 until 09:25, following Good Morning Britain. The programme replaced Kelly's previous show, GMTV with Lorraine.

CITV
CITV is broadcast each weekend on ITV Breakfast on weekends originally from 06:00-09:25 with their defunct magazine show, Scrambled!. In the summer holidays, it is usually cut back to 8.25am.

Weekends

References

External links
Daybreak at itv.com
Lorraine at itv.com
CITV at itv.com

ITV Breakfast
ITV Breakfast
Breakfast programmes
ITV Breakfast